Amauropelta subtilis, synonym Thelypteris subtilis, is a species of fern in the family Thelypteridaceae. It is endemic to Ecuador. It was found in the Andean forest. Its natural habitat is subtropical or tropical moist montane forests. It is threatened by habitat destruction, but apart from that, there are no other known threats.

References

 

Thelypteridaceae
Endemic flora of Ecuador
Vulnerable flora of South America
Taxonomy articles created by Polbot
Taxobox binomials not recognized by IUCN